Slánoll, son of Ollom Fotla, was, according to medieval Irish legend and historical tradition, a High King of Ireland. He succeeded to throne on the death of his brother Fínnachta. It is said that there was no disease during his reign (his name is explained as Old Irish slán, "whole, healthy"; oll, "great, ample"). After a reign of fifteen, or seventeen, or thirty years, he was found dead of unknown causes in his bed in Tara, and was succeeded by his brother Géde Ollgothach. When his body was dug up forty years later by his son Ailill, it showed no sign of decomposition. The chronology of Geoffrey Keating's Foras Feasa ar Éirinn dates his reign to 895–880 BC, that of the Annals of the Four Masters to 1257–1241 BC.

References

Legendary High Kings of Ireland